Zembrė  is a river of  Alytus district municipality, Alytus County, southern Lithuania.

It is a left tributary of the river Neman.

References
 

Rivers of Lithuania
Alytus District Municipality